Rehoboam was, according to the Hebrew Bible, the last monarch of the United Kingdom of Israel and the first monarch of the Kingdom of Judah after the former's split. He was a son of and the successor to Solomon and a grandson of David. In the account of I Kings and II Chronicles, Rehoboam was initially a king of the United Monarchy, but later saw his rule limited to only the Kingdom of Judah in the south following a rebellion by the ten northern tribes of Israel in 932/931 BCE, which led to the formation of the independent Kingdom of Israel under the rule of Jeroboam in the north.

Biblical background

According to the Jewish Encyclopedia, "Solomon's wisdom and power were not sufficient to prevent the rebellion of several of his border cities. Damascus under Rezon secured its independence [from] Solomon; and Jeroboam, a superintendent of works, his ambition stirred by the words of the prophet Ahijah, fled to Egypt. Thus before the death of Solomon, the apparently unified kingdom of David began to disintegrate. With Damascus independent and a powerful man of Ephraim, the most prominent of the Ten Tribes, awaiting his opportunity, the future of Solomon's kingdom became dubious".

According to 1 Kings 11:1-13, Solomon had broken the mandate of the Torah by marrying foreign wives and being influenced by them, worshipping and building shrines to the Moabite and Ammonite gods: 

Rehoboam's mother, Naamah, was an Ammonitess, and thus one of the foreign wives whom Solomon married. In the Revised Version she is referred to as "the Ammonitess".

Biblical narrative
Conventional biblical chronology dates the start of Rehoboam's reign to the mid-10th century BC. His reign is described in 1 Kings 12 and 1 Kings 14:21-31 and in 2 Chronicles in the Hebrew Bible. Rehoboam was 41 years old (16 in Chapter 12 of Kings III in the Septuagint) when he ascended the throne.

The assembly for the coronation of Solomon's successor, Rehoboam, was called at Shechem, the one sacredly historic city within the territory of the Ten Tribes. Before the coronation took place the assembly requested certain reforms in the policy followed by Rehoboam's father, Solomon. The reforms requested would materially reduce the royal exchequer and hence its power to continue the magnificence of Solomon's court. The older men counselled Rehoboam at least to speak to the people in a civil manner (it is not clear whether they counselled him to accept the demands). However, the new king sought the advice from the young men he had grown up with, who advised the king to show no weakness to the people, and to tax them even more, which Rehoboam did.

Although the ostensible reason was the heavy burden laid upon Israel because of Solomon's great outlay for buildings and for the luxury of all kinds, the other reasons include the historical opposition between the north and the south. The two sections had acted independently until David, by his victories, succeeded in uniting all the tribes, though the Ephraimitic jealousy was ever ready to develop into open revolt. Religious considerations were also operative. The building of the Temple was a severe blow for the various sanctuaries scattered through the land, and the priests of the high places probably supported the revolt. Josephus (Ant., VIII., viii. 3) has the rebels exclaim: "We leave to Rehoboam the Temple his father built."

Jeroboam and the people rebelled, with the ten northern tribes breaking away and forming a separate kingdom. The new breakaway kingdom continued to be called Kingdom of Israel, and was also known as Samaria, or Ephraim or the northern kingdom. The realm Rehoboam was left with was called Kingdom of Judah.

During Rehoboam's 17-year reign, he retained Jerusalem as Judah's capital but

Civil war
Rehoboam went to war against the new Kingdom of Israel with a force of 180,000 soldiers. However, he was advised against fighting his brethren, and so returned to Jerusalem. The narrative reports that Israel and Judah were in a state of war throughout his 17-year reign.

Egyptian invasion

In the fifth year of Rehoboam's reign, Shishak, king of Egypt, brought a huge army and took many cities. According to Joshua, son of Nadav, the mention in 2 Chronicles 11, 6 sqq., that Rehoboam built fifteen fortified cities, indicates that the attack was not unexpected. The account in Chronicles states that Shishak marched with 1,200 chariots, 60,000 horsemen and troops who came with him from Egypt: Libyans, Sukkites, and Kushites. Shishak's armies captured all of the fortified towns leading to Jerusalem between Gezer and Gibeon. When they laid siege to Jerusalem, Rehoboam gave Shishak all of the treasures out of the temple as a tribute. The Egyptian campaign cut off trade with south Arabia via Elath and the Negev that had been established during Solomon's reign. Judah became a vassal state of Egypt.

Succession 
Rehoboam had 18 wives and 60 concubines. They bore him 28 sons and 60 daughters. His wives included Mahalath, the daughter of Jerimoth the son of David, and Abihail, the daughter of Eliab the son of Jesse. His sons with Mahalath were Jeush, Shemariah, and Zaham. After Mahalath he married his cousin Maacah, daughter of Absalom, David's son. His sons with Maacah were Abijam, Attai, Ziza, and Shelomith. The names of his other wives, sons and all his daughters are not given.

Rehoboam reigned for 17 years. When he died he was buried beside his ancestors in Jerusalem. He was succeeded by his son Abijam.

Rabbinic literature
It was difficult to maintain the Messianic claims of the house of David due to that Rehoboam, the son of King Solomon, was born of an Ammonite woman (I Kings, xiv. 21–31); but it was adduced as an illustration of divine Providence which selected the "two doves," Ruth, the Moabite, and Naamah, the Ammonitess, for honourable distinction (B. Ḳ. 38b). Naamah An Ammonitess; one of Solomon's wives and mother of Rehoboam (I Kings xiv. 21, 31; II Chron. xii. 13). In the second Greek account (I Kings xii. 24) Naamah is said to have been the daughter of Hanun (Ἄνα), son of Nahash, a king of Ammon (II Sam. x. 1–4). Naamah is praised, in B. Ḳ. 38b, for her righteousness, on account of which Moses had previously been warned by God not to make war upon the Ammonites (comp. Deut. ii. 19), as Naamah was to descend from them.

Rehoboam was the son of an Ammonite woman; and when David praised God because it was permissible to marry Ammonites and Moabites, he held the child upon his knees, giving thanks for himself as well as for Rehoboam, since this permission was of advantage to them both (Yeb. 77a). Rehoboam was stricken with a running sore as a punishment for the curse which David had invoked upon Joab (II Sam. iii. 29) when he prayed that Joab's house might forever be afflicted with leprosy and running sores (Sanh. 48b). All the treasures which Israel had brought from Egypt were kept until the Egyptian king Shishak (I Kings xiv. 25, 26) took them from Rehoboam (Pes. 119a).

Biblical chronology 
Using the information in Kings and Chronicles, Edwin Thiele has calculated the date for the division of the kingdom is 931–930 BCE. Thiele noticed that for the first seven kings of Israel (ignoring Zimri's inconsequential seven-day reign), the synchronisms to Judean kings fell progressively behind by one year for each king. Thiele saw this as evidence that the northern kingdom was measuring the years by a non-accession system (first partial year of reign was counted as year one), whereas the southern kingdom was using the accession method (it was counted as year zero). Once this was understood, the various reign lengths and cross-synchronisms for these kings were worked out, and the sum of reigns for both kingdoms produced 931/930 BCE for the division of the kingdom when working backwards from the Battle of Qarqar in 853 BCE. According to newer chronologists such as Gershon Galil and Kenneth Kitchen, however, the values are 931 BCE for the beginning of the coregency and 915/914 BCE for Rehoboam's death.

One episode which the Bible places during the reign of Rehoboam, and which is confirmed by the records from the Bubastite Portal in Karnak and another archaeological find (without the specific mention of the name Rehoboam), is the Egyptian invasion of Judea by the Egyptian pharaoh Shoshenq I, who is identified by many with the biblical King Shishak. One of the most difficult issues in identifying Shishak with Shoshenq I is the biblical statement that "King Shishak of Egypt attacked Jerusalem. He seized the treasures of the Lord's temple and the royal palace", making this Shoshenq's biggest prize, whereas the Bubastite Portal lists do not include Jerusalem or any city from central Judea among the surviving names in the list of Shoshenq's conquests.

In popular culture 

Rehoboam is portrayed by Gino Leurini in The Queen of Sheba (1952) and by Dexter Fletcher in Solomon (1997).

In Season 3 of the HBO show Westworld, the artificial intelligence entity dictating the fate of humans through algorithmic analysis is named “Rehoboam.” It is the successor to a prior version called “Solomon” (which was the successor to “David.”) Like the historical Rehoboam, this AI version coincided with the demise of the rule of its line.

References

10th-century BC Kings of Judah
Solomon
970s BC births
910s BC deaths
Jewish royalty
Dethroned monarchs